Donald L. Iverson (February 3, 1923 – March 20, 1999) was an American politician, who served in the Wisconsin State Assembly.

Biography
Iverson was born in St. Croix Falls, Wisconsin. After graduating from St. Croix Falls High School, he attended the University of Wisconsin-River Falls and the Illinois College of Optometry. During World War II, Iverson served in the United States Army in the Middle East Theatre.

Political career
Iverson was elected to the Assembly in 1964. Additionally, he was a member of the St. Croix County, Wisconsin Board of Supervisors and a Hudson, Wisconsin alderman. He was a Democrat.

References

People from Hudson, Wisconsin
County supervisors in Wisconsin
Wisconsin city council members
Democratic Party members of the Wisconsin State Assembly
Military personnel from Wisconsin
United States Army soldiers
United States Army personnel of World War II
University of Wisconsin–River Falls alumni
Illinois College of Optometry alumni
1923 births
1999 deaths
20th-century American politicians
People from St. Croix Falls, Wisconsin